Dariusz Garbocz (born 11 January 1971), is a Polish former ice hockey player. He played for GKS Tychy, KKH Katowice, and VIK Västerås HK during his career. He also played for the Polish national team at the 1992 Winter Olympics.

References

External links
 

1971 births
Living people
GKS Katowice (ice hockey) players
GKS Tychy (ice hockey) players
Ice hockey players at the 1992 Winter Olympics
Naprzód Janów players
Olympic ice hockey players of Poland
Polish ice hockey defencemen
Sportspeople from Katowice
VIK Västerås HK players
Polish expatriate sportspeople in Sweden